These are the official results of the Women's High Jump event at the 2003 World Championships in Paris, France. There was a total of 25 participating athletes, with the final being held on Sunday, 31 August 2003.

Medalists

Schedule
All times are Central European Time (UTC+1)

Abbreviations
All results shown are in metres

Results

Qualification
Qualification: 1.93 m (Q) or best 12 performances (q)

Final

See also
2003 High Jump Year Ranking
Athletics at the 2003 Pan American Games – Women's high jump

References

 Results(  2009-05-14)
 todor66

J
High jump at the World Athletics Championships
2003 in women's athletics